Tsoa, Tshwa or Tshuwau, also known as Kua and Hiechware, is an East Kalahari Khoe dialect cluster spoken by several thousand people in Botswana and Zimbabwe.  

One of the dialects is Tjwao (formerly spelled 'Tshwao'), the only Khoisan language in Zimbabwe, where "Koisan" is a language officially recognised in the constitution.

Dialects
Tsoa–Kua is a dialect cluster, which is still poorly studied but seems to include: 
Tsoa, also known as Hiechware and as various other combinations of Hio-, Hie-, Hai- + Chwa, Tshwa, Chuwau, Tshuwau + -re, -ri; also as Sarwa, Sesarwa (the Tswana name), Gǁabake-Ntshori, Tati, and Kwe-Etshori Kwee.  Zimbabwean Tshwao apparently belongs here.
Kua, also spelled Cua and Tyhua.  That is, both Tsoa and Kua may be pronounced something like , and it's not clear that they are distinct dialects.
Cire Cire , spoken in the area around Nata in Botswana.

Phonology
The following inventory is of the Kua dialect:

The Cire-cire (not cited) dialect has the following consonant inventory:

The clicks have a very uneven distribution: Only a dozen words begin with one of the palatal clicks, and these are replaced by dental clicks among younger speakers. Only half a dozen words start with one of the alveolar clicks, and half a dozen more with one of the affricated clicks. These rather marginal sounds are placed in parentheses in the chart.

Tsoa has the five vowels , and three nasal vowels . It is not clear if Tsoa has long vowels, or simply sequences of identical vowels .

There are two tones, high and low, plus a few cases of mid tone.

In the northern dialect of Kua, like all other East Kalahari Khoe languages, the palatal click series has become palatal stops. Southern Kua has retained the palatal clicks, but the dental stops have palatalized, as they have in Gǀui and ǂʼAmkoe.

References

Bibliography
Vossen, Rainer (ed.). 2013a. The Khoesan Languages. London & New York: Routledge.

External links
Kua/Tsua basic lexicon at the Global Lexicostatistical Database

Khoe languages
Languages of Botswana
Languages of Zimbabwe